Stella Kyriakides (born 10 March 1956) is a Cypriot psychologist and politician of the conservative Democratic Rally party who has been serving as European Commissioner for Health and Food Safety since 2019. She was the first Cypriot national and third woman to serve as President of the Parliamentary Assembly of the Council of Europe.

Early life and education
Born in Nicosia, Kyriakides got a degree in psychology from the University of Reading and a master's degree in child maladjustment at the Victoria University of Manchester.

Early career
Kyriakides worked in the Ministry of Health between 1976 and 2006, as a clinical psychologist in the department of Child and Adolescent psychiatry.

In 1999 Kyriakides was elected as president of the First Breast Cancer Movement in Cyprus. From 2004 until 2006, she served as president of the European Breast Cancer Coalition Europa Donna. In 2016, she was appointed President of the National Committee on Cancer Strategy of the Council.

Personal life
Kyriakides has two children. She had breast cancer in 1996 and 2004.

Political career

Politics of Cyprus
Standing for the conservative Democratic Rally, Kyriakides was elected as a deputy in the 2006 Cypriot legislative election, representing Nicosia District, Since 2013, Kyriakides has served as a vice president of the Democratic Rally party, under the leadership of its president Nicos Anastasiades.

In 2018, Kyriakides pushed for a law decriminalizing abortion in Cyprus.

Council of Europe
In addition to her parliamentary duties in Cyprus, from 2012 until 2019 Kyriakides served as the chairperson of the Cyprus delegation to the Parliamentary Assembly of the Council of Europe (PACE). From 2016 until 2018, she chaired the PACE Committee on Social Affairs, Health, and Regional Development. In October 2017, after the resignation of the Spanish member Pedro Agramunt, she ran for the presidency of the PACE, winning the voting in the third round against the Lithuanian Emanuelis Zingeris. From 2018 until 2019, she served as the PACE representative to the Venice Commission.

European Commissioner
Following the 2019 European elections, President Nicos Anastasiades nominated Kyriakides to become the country's next European Commissioner.

In early March 2020, Kyriakides was appointed by President Ursula von der Leyen to serve on a special task force to coordinate the European Union's response to the COVID-19 pandemic.

Vaccination procurement during COVID-19 pandemic
Kyriakides came under attack by the international media and the publicas her procurement of COVID-19 vaccines was said to be slow and insufficient, especially in comparison to the United States and the United Kingdom.  AstraZeneca's CEO, Soriot, blamed the EU for being three months slower than the U.K. in finalizing its purchase agreements for the vaccine, which AstraZeneca had developed. 
According to the German tabloid newspaper Bild-Zeitung, Germany’s Health Minister Jens Spahn had warned  Chancellor Angela Merkel about Kyriakides’ slow response time. However, Kyriakides rejected all criticism and defended the EU joint procurement strategy, claiming that it had "medical and social virtues". She also rejected the logic of "first come, first served,", arguing "that may work at the neighborhood butcher’s but not in contracts." AstraZeneca hit back, stating that the contract only included 'best efforts' to supply the EU commission, whereas the UK contract included provisions to supply the entirety of the UK from the company’s British plants first, before allowing export overseas.

References

1956 births
Living people
Alumni of the University of Manchester
Alumni of the University of Reading
Cypriot European Commissioners
21st-century Cypriot women politicians
21st-century Cypriot politicians
Democratic Rally politicians
Members of the House of Representatives (Cyprus)
Members of the Parliamentary Assembly of the Council of Europe
People from Nicosia
Women European Commissioners
Women psychologists
European Commissioners 2019–2024